Ali Amrakhovich Gadzhibekov (born 6 August 1989) is a Russian professional footballer of Lezgin descent, who plays as a centre-back.

Career

Club
Gadzhibekov made his professional debut in the Russian First Division in 2006 for FC Anzhi Makhachkala.
He made his Russian Premier League debut for Anzhi on 4 July 2010 in a game against FC Zenit Saint Petersburg.

After 10 years with Anzhi Makhachkala, Gadzhibekov left the club in January 2017 by mutual termination of his contract, going on to sign a three-and-a-half-year contract with Krylia Sovetov on 13 January 2017.

On 20 July 2018, he signed with FC Yenisey Krasnoyarsk on loan for the 2018–19 season.

On 25 January, Aksu announced the signing of Gadzhibekov.

Personal life
He is the younger brother of Albert Gadzhibekov.

Career statistics

References

External links

1989 births
Footballers from Makhachkala
Living people
Russian footballers
Russia national football B team footballers
Association football midfielders
FC Anzhi Makhachkala players
Russian Premier League players
PFC Krylia Sovetov Samara players
FC Yenisey Krasnoyarsk players
FC Nizhny Novgorod (2015) players
Russian people of Lezgian descent
FC Chayka Peschanokopskoye players